Dottin is a surname. Notable people with the surname include:
Deandra Dottin (born 1991), Barbadian athlete
Georges Dottin (1863–1928), French philologist, Celtic scholar, and politician
Henderson Dottin (born 1980), Barbadian athlete
Walter Dottin ( 1554–1635), English politician